Jan Košek (28 July 1884 – 30 December 1927) was a Czech footballer who played as a striker.

Early life 
Jan Košek was born in Turnov in 1884. His father was Jan Baptista Košek and his mother was Františka Košek, originally Peldova. They raised five children, and only Jan lived to adulthood. Jan had three sisters and a brother and the family owned two houses, numbers 31 and 40 on Hrusticka street. He spent his childhood in Turnov, where he attended his local school.

The first match that was ever recorded, that Jan played in, was in 1889 for Letenský kroužek. The score ended 5–4 to Letenský kroužek and Košek scored 3 of the 5. For the first few years of his life in Prague, Košek played for Academic Gymnasium Prague, Letenský kroužek and Union Letná.

Club career 
On February 22 1903, Jan made his debut as an 18 year old, in the red a white colours of  Slavia Prague, in a 9-1 win vs CAFC Vinohrady. Journalists praised him, fans raised eyebrows and his goals convinced everyone.

On April 1, 1903, Slavia Prague acquired the pupil of the Academic Gymnasium Jan Košek and publicly admitted that the transfer took place (for the first time in our football history) for money. She paid the membership fees to the current SK Union club, paid for club membership in our club and gave the student "the necessary financial support" and in his first season with Slavia he scored 64 goals, in international friendlies, as a 19 year old.

On April 2, 1904, SK Slavia defeated London's Civil Service FC 6: 3. A day later then 3: 2. Slavie line-up: Jan Hejda - Páclt, Ferdinand Veselý, Nový, Hrabě, Strádal, Jindřich Baumruk, Josef Benda, Jan Jenny-Starý, Jan Košek and Slava Vaněk. Karel Setzer-Bloomer played in the second match. Košek scored four goals, Josef Benda scored three and Hrabě and Jan Jenny-Starý scored one. In November of 1904 he transferred to Sparta Prague and played a year there with fellow Slavia Prague teammates, Jindřich Baumruk and Rudolf Krummer. In the same year, both his parents and his sister died. He at least scored 45 goals this year for Slavia Prague. On December 25, 1904, Sparta played against First Vienna and won 7-2. Košek scored 7 goals. The next day, a game against Wiener AC, which ended 3-3. Košek scored 3 goals and the referee was Hugo Meisl.

From 13 November 1904 to the 12 November 1905 Jan played more than 25 games and scored more than 75 goals for Sparta Prague. 

In 1905 he returned back to Slavia Prague and met his new coach Jake Madden. The way Slavia Prague trained changed massively, it became more expertly done and more modern. At this point in his career for Slavia Prague, he scored 178 goals. Jan was highly coveted by Vienna Cricket and Football Club and by Rangers

1906 was a great year for him and Slavia Prague. During this year, Slavia Prague played 48 matches and won 39 times, with a goals scored to goals conceded ratio of 340:62. He at least scored 114 goals for Slavia Prague this season. On 24 March Slavia Prague played a match against Budapesti Postás SE, in which Jan scored 4 goals, in one incident in the match, Jan kicked the ball at goalkeeper Fekete, so hard that it left him injured an unable to carry on with the match.On the 25 February 1906, Slavia Prague beat Germania Schwechater 16-0. Jan scored three goals in a row, including one with his hand, but the referee didn't see this and gave the goal. On 10 October he scored his 300th goal for Slavia Prague in a 7–2 win against BTC.

In 1907, Slavia Prague continued to play a vast amount of international friendly matches. Most of these matches were played against teams from neighbouring countries. Also this year, Slavia Prague won their biggest ever derby in a 9–1 against Sparta Prague. Jan scored twice in this match. Jan scored 77 goals in 31 games for Slavia Prague this season. Being second behind Josef Bělka with 109 in 38. On November 10, Jan scored 6 goals in 8-1 against , making this his 399th goal for Slavia in only 130 matches.

In 1908, Slavia Prague won the Charity Cup, with Jan scoring more than 50 goals with Newcastle United eyeing him up.

In 1909, Slavia Prague only played a total of 40 matches, Jan scored 49 goals. In a game against , in May, the Narodni Listy journalist describes one of Košek’s goals; “The goalkeeper flies towards him, they both collide with each other, but Košek, with a coolness reminiscent of similar masterful feats by Bloomer, he kicks the ball into the net.”

In 1910 Slavia Prague played 21 matches and didn't lose a single one. These matches were played against amateur teams from England. Slavia Prague managed to win a second Charity Cup. In the semi-final Slavia Prague beat Sparta Prague 5–1 and in the final Slavia Prague won 5–2 against CFK Smíchov Praha. In both of these games Jan scored a goal. During this season Jan played his 200th match for Slavia Prague, before this games he had scored 576 goals in 199 games. By October Jan had scored 600 goals in his career, scoring 2 in a 5-0 victory over Old Grammarians

1911 was the best year for Jan as he scored 135 goals. In a game against Aberdeen, the score was 2–2 and in the 82nd minute, Košek took the ball on the half turn and rifled it into the net from 30 meters. This goal was called, by many, the best of his 819. This year he also won another Charity Cup. At this point he scored 700 goals for Slavia Prague. In the sports section of a Narodni listy paper, the author wrote "Shall we see if Košek gets his 1000th goal", predicting that Jan will score 1000 goals in the future. Also, Jan was elected captain of Slavia Prague on January 7

1912 was another great year for Košek, he notched up 68 goals. For the third time in a row, Slavia Prague won the Charity Cup, in a 4–3 victory against FK Viktoria Žižkov. On March 26, 1912, the Slavia footballers won over the team of English students at the University of London 6: 1. The day before, on March 25, they won 5: 0. In these matches, Košek scored 6 goals, Šroubek and Jaroslav Bohata after two goals, Široký scored one, this total is for both games together. In addition to the shooters, Romováček's goalkeepers were also on the field in both matches, and Pimmer caught the next day. Krummer, Veselý and Hajný played in the defence, E. Benda, Majzl, G. Macoun and Holý were in the middle and Medek the attacker.

1913 was Košek's final full year at Slavia Prague as a player. On March 29 he announced that he was to retire from football at the age of just 29.

1914 sparked a change of decision from Košek, as he agreed to play several games for Slavia Prague, due to lack of players. During this year he played a total of 6 games and scored 8 goals.

Career statistics

International career
Jan Košek would regularly play for Bohemia and Moravia as well as the Prague national team. In 1903 he defended the colours of the national team of Prague in a game against Budapest, which Prague lost 2–1.

Many of his games for Prague are not classified in his official statistics. The Bohemia and Moravia played a number of matches under the regulations of FIFA from 1906-1908. Jan took part in three of them and scored four goals. On 7 October 1906 Bohemia and Moravia drew 4–4 with Hungary and Jan scored a goal in the 88th minute to set the final score. Kosek 2, Baumruk scored 1 and Jan Jenny-Stary scored the other, however other sources claim that Košek scored 2 and so did Jenny Stary. The next year they met again in a friendly, Bohemia and Moravia won 5–3 and Jan scored a hat-trick) and Josef Bělka scored the other two. But again another source claims that Jan scored 4 and Josef only got
one.

In 1908, FIFA did not allow Bohemia and Moravia to take part in the 1908 London Olympics.

In 1909, the Bohemia and Moravia team went on a tour to England and France, playing 6 games. In these six games Bohemia came up against England FA, Eastern Counties and Lille. Košek scored at least 11 goals. 

In 1911, Košek won the European Amateur Championship. On they way to the tournament, they played a team from Brussels, in which they defeated them 6–1 with Košek scoring two goals.

Style of play
Košek was a very strong and fast athlete, clocking 100m in 11 seconds. He had such a powerful left-foot which allowed him to score many longshots. Due to his high speed, he always played on the final man on the attack and was able to spin away from the defender with ease. He would complete the attack from any position on the pitch.

Wilhelm Cepurski, former Wisła Kraków player, once said about Jan: "Košek, yes, the leading forward of Slavia. I had the pleasure to tackle him in the match. The peasant was bulky, his legs like telegraph poles. Taking advantage of the fact that the ball was wet, heavy and slippery, he often hit from a distance, and our poor goalkeeper did not have the strength to stop such shots and the result 10–3 to Slavia Prague."

Mr. Jenšík and Mr. Macků write in the Chronicle of Czech Football:
"Jindrich Baumruk just lifts his leg, he magically catches the ball on the tip of his foot and turns as if on a spinning wheel and already kicks it down the line. He centers beautifully, Košek stands like a pillar of salt, waiting. However, in this he starts out like the king of animals with a mane. Three or four jumps. Then he swings his powerful leg towards the ball. It flapped like a wet banner in the wind. A cannon firecracker. The low-flying ball whistles like an arrow from a distance of some thirty-five meters from the opponents goal. The goalkeeper just turns his head and shakes a little. But the ball is already rippling in the net. A wonderful goal!"

Ferdinand Scheinost, journalist and writer, considered Jan Košek the greatest football personality he had seen and experienced. In the same book, he says about him:
"I have traveled the world and seen hundreds of the best players of all nations play, including English professionals. However, I have never seen a shooter who could bear the comparison with Jenda Košek. What Enrico Caruso was as a tenor, Košek meant as a shooter. It was a whirlwind when Václav Pilát went out into the deserted wing. But Košek - that was lightning, it just flashed as he sprinted, it was as if the others stood still. And it was beneath his dignity to run to the goal. From a large distance, he had shot the ball that could not be caught. He could only be challenged if two players behind him were guarding him."

Košek was one of the most brilliant phenomena in the pre-war years of Czech football and there were times when  he was mentioned all around Europe. As a striker, Košek excelled with great speed and shooting skills, his shots were unstoppable.

Legacy
Statisticians have claimed he scored over 800 times in his career, with the figures 804, 812 and 819 coming up the most frequently. Some sources even state that he scored over 1000 goals. He scored a total of 819 goals for Slavia Prague, only second to Josef Bican with 1137 goals. As part of Slavia Prague 125th anniversary Jan was announced as one of the players in a “Historic Eleven” voted by the fans. In the book: pět tisíc gólů by Josef Pondelik, Pondelik describes and compares Jan Košek's and Josef Bican's opinion from the fans, mentioning; that only eighty percent of fans enjoy Jan Košek's heroic style of football all those years ago, whereas one hundred percent of fans admire Josef Bican's game.

Athletics 
In 1905, Košek took part a athletics competition. He ran;
 60 meters in 7.0 seconds
 100 yards in 10.2 seconds
 100 meters in 11.0 seconds
 220 yard hurdles in 33.6 seconds
 300 meters in 38.6s
He also ran;
50 meter in 5.8 seconds
200 meters 24.2 seconds
220 yards 24.8
He held the joint world record for 60 meters and Czech records for 50m, 60m, 100m, 200m, 300m and 100 yards.

In 1906, Košek took part in 60m sprint in the Austrian Championships. Due to a slow start he only finished 3rd in the race.

Life after career
After his playing career Jan worked in senior positions at Slavia Prague for many years.

Personal life 
Jan's parents died in 1904, in May in Frantiska and in November it was Jan. Jan Košek is said to have suffered from a thyroid disease, hyperparathyroidism, since childhood. Among other things, it had an effect on his joints. With this disease, the joints stiffen, bones often break, and even if they don't, physical activity causes great pain. At first, the disease probably did not prevent him from his great performances, but later it started to worsen and ended his football career prematurely. What followed was the sad end of one of the fastest men and best strikers on the planet. Jan Košek allegedly ended up in total paralysis, when he was unable to move at all. He died on December 30, 1927, at the age of 43, which was a young age even for that time. 

Košek is a sibling-in-law to former teammate Jindrich Baumruk, due to Jan marrying Baumruk's sister, Julia Baumrukova. Also Košek's son is Jan Košek.

Honours
Charity Cup: 1910,1911,1912
Silver Cup: 1911
European Amateur Championship: 1911

References

1884 births
1927 deaths
AC Sparta Prague players
SK Slavia Prague players
Czechoslovak footballers
Association football forwards
SK Slavia Prague non-playing staff
Bohemia international footballers
People from Turnov